Naoroji may refer to:

Dadabhai Naoroji (1825-1917), Parsi intellectual, educator, cotton trader
Dadabhai Naoroji Road, road in Mumbai, India
Naoroji Furdunji (1817–1885), Parsi reformer from Bombay
Naroji Pirojaha Godrej (1916-1990), Indian businessman
Nowroji Saklatwala (1875–1938), Indian businessman, third chairman of the Tata Group 
Navroji Mistri (1885–1953), Indian entrepreneur and philanthropist
Jamshyd Naoroji Godrej (born 1949), Indian industrialist
Rishad Naoroji (born 1951), Indian billionaire environmentalist
Prenolepis naoroji, species of ant in the subfamily Formicinae
Nowroji Road, road in Visakhapatnam, Indian
Nowrosjee Wadia College, college in Pune, India